David Patterson may refer to:

David Patterson (computer scientist) (born 1947), American professor of computer science at UC Berkeley
Dave Patterson (born 1956), American baseball player
David Patterson (guitarist) (born 1966), American guitarist who was a founding member of the New World Guitar Trio
David Patterson (American football) (born 1985), defensive lineman for the Ohio State Buckeyes and the Atlanta Falcons
David J. Patterson (born 1950), Irish biologist
David P. Patterson (c.1840–1879), director of New Jersey and New York Railroad, and a town father of Hillsdale, New Jersey
David T. Patterson (1818–1891), American politician; Democrat from Tennessee; in U.S. Senate 1866–69
David Allen Patterson, professor, researcher, author and Native American advocate
David Patterson (historian), who mainly researches the Holocaust, Jewish thought, and antisemitism

See also
46053 Davidpatterson, asteroid named after American amateur astronomer
David Paterson (born 1954), 55th governor of New York, 2008–2010
David Paterson (disambiguation)
David Peterson (born 1943), twentieth premier of Ontario, 1985–1990
David Patterson Dyer (1838–1924), American politician; Republican from Missouri; in U.S. Congress 1869–71
David Patterson Ellerman (born 1943), a philosopher and author